Złatna  is a village in the administrative district of Gmina Ujsoły, within Żywiec County, Silesian Voivodeship, in southern Poland, close to the border with Slovakia. The village has a population of 801. On April 1 of 2020 a Thermo-Car company suspended its connections in Złatna.

References

Villages in Żywiec County